Essingen is a municipality in the Südliche Weinstraße district, in Rhineland-Palatinate, Germany.

Notable people
 John George Nicolay (1832-1901) biographer, secretary to United States president Abraham Lincoln

References

Municipalities in Rhineland-Palatinate
Südliche Weinstraße